Jean-Baptiste Édouard Bornet (September 2, 1828, Guérigny – December 18, 1911, Paris) was a French botanist.

Life
Bornet studied medicine in Paris, and in 1886 became a member of the French Académie des sciences. With Gustave Thuret, he was co-author of Notes algologiques (1876-1880) and the Études phycologiques (1878), both works being published after Thuret's death in 1875. He helped establish the nature of lichens and was the first to find the reproductive process of red algae. In the field of lichenology, he wrote Recherches sur les gonidies des lichens (1873). With Charles Flahault, he published on Nostocaceae: Revision des Nostocacées héterocystées (1886–88).

Awards and honours
In 1877, botanist Munier-Chalmas published Bornetella is a genus of green algae in the family Dasycladaceae and named in Jean-Baptiste Édouard Bornet's honor.

Bornet was elected a member of the Royal Swedish Academy of Sciences in 1888.

He was awarded the Linnean Medal in 1891.

He was admitted as a Foreign Member to the United Kingdom's Royal Society in 1910.

See also
 :Category:Taxa named by Jean-Baptiste Édouard Bornet

References

1828 births
1911 deaths
20th-century French botanists
People from Nièvre
Members of the Royal Swedish Academy of Sciences
Foreign Members of the Royal Society
Foreign associates of the National Academy of Sciences
Members of the French Academy of Sciences
French phycologists
19th-century French botanists
Members of the Göttingen Academy of Sciences and Humanities
Members of the Royal Society of Sciences in Uppsala